The 5th album of Stillste Stund.
This album is also available as a limited edition in digipack format with a bonus disc.

Track listing
"Käfigseele"– 5:20
"Viktor (Von Rosen und Nekrosen)"– 5:06
"Alice III (Schwesterherz)"– 5:19
"Tiefenritt"– 5:14
"Kammerspiel"– 6:43
"Sternenwacht"– 5:48
"Speichel, Laub & Saitenspiel"– 7:45
"Heidnisch Barbastella"– 5:41
"Marsch in Unschärfe Verlorener"– 5:50
"Die Hure Babylon"– 6:03
"Der Galaktische Zoo"– 4:56
"Licht frisst Stille, Schwarz frisst Licht"– 5:24

Bonus Disc: Alice EP - Projektionen, Reflexionen, Variationen
"Multiple Spiegelwelt (Prolog)"– 2:18
"Alice (Der Spiegeltanz) - remastert"– 5:56
"Dissoziatives Wunderland (Zwischenspiel I)"– 2:03
"Alice II (Nie allein mit dir) - ungekürzte Version"– 7:11
"Diffuse Leibhaft (Zwischenspiel II)"– 1:07
"Alice III (Schwesterherz) - ungekürzte Version"– 6:08
"Präfinales Schattenwerk (Epilog)"– 2:58
"Letzte Führung"– 1:55
"Nekrolog A. (Lesung)"– 8:13
"Alice III (Das Ich-Remix)"– 4:10

Info
 Music & lyrics, acoustic & electronic instruments, programming & production by Oliver Uckermann
 Male vocals by Oliver Uckermann
 Female vocals  by Birgit Strunz
 Text/vocals track 4 as well as text/vocal-parts tracks 1, 2, 3, 6, 8, 11 by Birgit Strunz
 Album artwork & photography by Birgit Strunz

References
 Discography at official website
 
 

2008 albums
Alice In... albums
Stillste Stund albums